Mehdiabad (also Romanized as Mehdīābād) is a village in Sahrarud Rural District, in the Central District of Fasa County, Fars Province, Iran. At the 2006 census, its population was 36, in 7 families.

References 

Populated places in Fasa County